Melaleuca agathosmoides is a shrub in the myrtle family, Myrtaceae and is endemic to a small area in the south-west of Western Australia. It is unusual in the genus in that its flowers appear along long lengths of old wood.

Description 
 
The flowers are ramiflorous, that is they grow along lengths of old wood rather than at the ends of branches or in the axils of leaves, singly or in groups of up to 20. The stamens are grouped in five bundles around the flower, each bundle containing 12 to 19 stamens. The flowers are cream or white to greenish-white and appear between July and November.

Taxonomy and naming
Melaleuca agathosmoides was first formally described in 1939 by Charles Austin Gardner from a specimen collected in the Coolgardie District at "Hatter's Hill, north of Ravensthorpe, in red loamy gravelly soil, [flowering] Sept. 1929". The specific epithet (agathosmoides) is a reference to its similarity to plants in the genus Agathosma.

Distribution and habitat
This melaleuca is restricted to the Lake King district of Western Australia in the Mallee biogeographic region. It grows in gravelly, red clay loam on hills.

Conservation status
Melaleuca agathosmoides is classified as "Priority One" by the Government of Western Australia Department of Parks and Wildlife, meaning that it is known from only one or a few locations that are potentially at risk.

References

agathosmoides
Myrtales of Australia
Plants described in 1939
Rosids of Western Australia
Endemic flora of Western Australia